Glyptoscelis is a genus of leaf beetles in the subfamily Eumolpinae. There are 38 species of Glyptoscelis described from North, Central and South America. There are also three species of Glyptoscelis known from the West Indies, though they are wrongly placed in the genus. In addition, a single species was described from Hunan, China in 2021.

According to BugGuide and ITIS, the genus is now placed in the tribe Eumolpini instead of Adoxini.

Species
These species belong to the genus Glyptoscelis:

 Glyptoscelis aeneipennis Baly, 1865
 Glyptoscelis albicans Baly, 1865 i c g b
 Glyptoscelis albida LeConte, 1859 i c g b
 Glyptoscelis alternata Crotch, 1873 i c g b
 Glyptoscelis aridis Van Dyke, 1938 i c g
 Glyptoscelis artemisiae Blake, 1967 i c g
 Glyptoscelis barbata (Say, 1826) i c g
 Glyptoscelis cahitae Blake, 1967
 Glyptoscelis chontalensis Jacoby, 1882
 Glyptoscelis coloradoensis Blake, 1967 i c g
 Glyptoscelis cryptica (Say, 1824) i c g b
 Glyptoscelis cylindrica Blake, 1967 i c g
 Glyptoscelis diabola Krauss, 1937 i c g
 Glyptoscelis dohrni Jacoby, 1900
 Glyptoscelis fascicularis Baly, 1865
 Glyptoscelis gayi Lefèvre, 1891
 Glyptoscelis gigas Jacoby, 1897
 Glyptoscelis guatemalensis Blake, 1967
 Glyptoscelis idahoensis Blake, 1967 i c g
 Glyptoscelis illustris Crotch, 1873 i c g b
 Glyptoscelis juniperi Blake, 1967 i c g b
 Glyptoscelis longior LeConte, 1878 i c g
 Glyptoscelis mexicana Jacoby, 1882
 Glyptoscelis monrosi Blake, 1952
 Glyptoscelis paraguayensis Jacoby, 1897
 Glyptoscelis parvula Blaisdell, 1921 i c g
 Glyptoscelis paula Blake, 1967 i c g
 Glyptoscelis peperi Blake, 1967 i c g
 Glyptoscelis pinnigera Blake, 1952
 Glyptoscelis prosopis Schaeffer, 1905 i c g b
 Glyptoscelis pubescens (Fabricius, 1777) i c g b (hairy leaf beetle)
 Glyptoscelis pulvinosus (Blanchard, 1851)
 Glyptoscelis septentrionalis Blake, 1967 i c g
 Glyptoscelis sequoiae Blaisdell, 1921 i c g
 Glyptoscelis sinica Moseyko, 2021
 Glyptoscelis sonorensis Blake, 1967
 Glyptoscelis squamulata Crotch, 1873 i c g b (grape bud beetle)
 Glyptoscelis vandykei Krauss, 1937 i c g
 Glyptoscelis yosemitae Krauss, 1937 i c g

Data sources: i = ITIS, c = Catalogue of Life, g = GBIF, b = Bugguide.net

Three additional species have been described from the West Indies. According to Doris Holmes Blake, in her 1967 review of the genus, they are wrongly placed in it:
 Glyptoscelis brevicornis (Olivier, 1808)
 Glyptoscelis fusca (Drapiez, 1820)
 Glyptoscelis hobsoni (Curtis, 1840)

References

Further reading

External links

 

Eumolpinae
Chrysomelidae genera
Articles created by Qbugbot
Taxa named by Louis Alexandre Auguste Chevrolat
Beetles of North America
Beetles of South America